Communist Consolidation (19351938) was an Indian revolutionary and communist organization, founded by Hare Krishna Konar among with other prisoners of the Cellular Jail with the ideology of Marx and Lenin's theory Marxism–Leninism. It was the largest resistance group against British rule in the Jail, this organization also led the historical 36-days hunger strike in 1937 where the British government had to bow before the demands of the political prisoners.

History (Before 1935)
The history of Communist Consolidation is older than, when the group was formed in 1935. On 12 May 1933, some of the prisoners of Cellular Jail gathered and started a hunger strike, causing the deaths of Mahavir Singh, Mohan Kishore Namadas, and Mohit Moitra. The British Raj acceded to the demands of the freedom fighters to stop the hunger strike and finally after 46 days hunger strike end on 26 June 1933.

Formation in 1935 
In 1935, Communist Consolidation was founded by 39 inmates, but the main mastermind to form this group was Hare Krishna Konar. The maximum of its members belong to the minority tendency of the Marxist and Communist or Jugantar part of Anushilan Samiti. Although this was a secret revolutionary group and the members of this organization swelled higher and higher.

They started a study circle named "A Veritable University of Freedom Fighters" and this group also started to teach about the principles of Socialism, Marxism and Communism were explained, how October Revolution happened who was Karl Marx, Friedrich Engels and finally in year 1936 the members of this organization claimed that they were fighting to uproot British Raj as well as to make the country totally Communist Country.

They only used the Class Struggle and Political Slogan “The “Inquilab Zindabad” and “Duniya ke Mazdooron ek ho” because they claimed that at first they were Nationalist Prisoners but after the formation of Communist Consolidation and reading about the principal of  Socialism, Marxism and Communism they started believing themself as a Political Prisoners.

Second Hunger Strike
The long hunger-strike movement in the Andamans in July and August 1937, led by the Communists, marked an important phase in India's national struggle. As nine-tenths of the total convicts in Andaman were from Bengal, the hunger strike of Andaman prisoners caused widespread outrage in Bengal where a strong movement for the release of political prisoners began.

Members 
The organization's membership expanded rapidly to more than 800 inmates.

Some of the members were:
Hare Krishna Konar, Founder of this organization, in April 1935
Niranjan Sengupta
Sudhangshu Dasgupta
Nalini Dasgupta
Shiv Verma
Ganesh Ghosh
Batukeshwar Dutt
Jaidev Kapoor
Ambika Chakrabarty
Satish Prakrashi
Sachindra Nath Sanyal
Biplabi Dhruvesh Chattopadhyay
Ananta Chakroborty
Subodh Roy
Bejoy Kumar Sinha
Jatindra Nath Das
Fakir Sen
Manmath Nath Gupta
Kalipada Chakrabarty
Lalmohan Sen

See also 

 Revolutionary movement for Indian independence
 Indian independence movement
 List of communist parties in India

References 

1935 establishments in India
Organizations established in 1935
Political parties established in 1935
Revolutionary movement for Indian independence
Organisations of Indian independence movement
Indian independence movement
Communism in India
Communist organizations
Communist organisations in India
History of socialism
Left-wing politics in India
Defunct communist parties in India
Socialism in India
Leftist organisations in India
Socialist organisations in India
Politics of the Andaman and Nicobar Islands
Communist Party of India